Smoking/No Smoking is a 1993 French comedy film. It was directed by Alain Resnais and written by Agnès Jaoui and Jean-Pierre Bacri, from the play Intimate Exchanges by Alan Ayckbourn. The film starred Pierre Arditi and Sabine Azéma.

It won the César Award for Best Film, Best Director, Best Actor and Best Writing.

Plot
"Smoking" and "No Smoking" are two segments of the film which are based on closely connected plays. The original plays covered eight separate stories, which have been pared down to three each for these movies. At a certain point in the story of each segment, the five female characters (all played by Sabine Azema) and the four male characters (all played by Pierre Arditi) have their lives skillfully recapped in terms of "what might have happened" if they had made or failed to make certain choices. For example, "No Smoking" focuses chiefly on the relationship between the mild-mannered Miles Coombes and his infinitely more aggressive and ambitious wife, Rowena.

The movie is set in the village of Hutton Buscel.

The narrator is voiced by Peter Hudson.

Cast
 Sabine Azéma as Celia Teasdale / Sylvie Bell / Irene Pridworthy / Rowena Coombes / Josephine Hamilton
 Pierre Arditi as Toby Teasdale / Miles Coombes / Lionel Hepplewick / Joe Hepplewick

Awards and nominations
 Berlin Film Festival (Germany)
 Won: Silver Bear – Outstanding Single Achievement (Alain Resnais)
 Nominated: Golden Bear
 César Awards (France)
 Won: Best Actor – Leading Role (Pierre Arditi)
 Won: Best Director (Alain Resnais)
 Won: Best Film
 Won: Best Production Design (Jacques Saulnier)
 Won: Best Writing (Jean-Pierre Bacri and Agnès Jaoui)
 Nominated: Best Actress – Leading Role (Sabine Azéma)
 Nominated: Best Cinematography (Renato Berta)
 Nominated: Best Editing (Albert Jurgenson)
 Nominated: Best Sound (Bernard Bats and Gérard Lamps)
 French Syndicate of Cinema Critics (France)
 Won: Best Film
 Louis Delluc Prize (France)
 Won: Best Film

References

External links
 

1993 films
1993 comedy films
French comedy films
1990s French-language films
French avant-garde and experimental films
Films directed by Alain Resnais
Films based on works by Alan Ayckbourn
Best Film César Award winners
Films whose director won the Best Director César Award
Films featuring a Best Actor César Award-winning performance
Louis Delluc Prize winners
Films released in separate parts
1990s avant-garde and experimental films
Films set in Yorkshire
Films produced by Michel Seydoux
1990s French films